Major General Ian Argyll Robertson of Brackla  (17 July 1913 – 10 January 2010) was a senior British Army officer.

Military career
Educated at Winchester College and Trinity College, Oxford, Robertson was commissioned into the Seaforth Highlanders on 13 July 1934. He served, on a temporary basis, as commanding officer of the 2nd Battalion, the Seaforth Highlanders during the Italian campaign of the Second World War and then took part in the Normandy landings in June 1944 and subsequent campaign in North West Europe.

After the war he became commanding officer of the 1st Battalion, the Seaforth Highlanders in 1954 and saw action during the Aden Emergency. He went on to be commander of 127 (East Lancashire) Infantry Brigade in August 1959, commandant of the School of Infantry at Warminster in August 1963 and General Officer Commanding 51st (Highland) Division in April 1964. After that he became Director of Equipment Policy at the Ministry of Defence in March 1966 before retiring in 1968.

He lived at Brackla, not far from Cawdor, and was granted the lairdly title "of Brackla" by the Court of the Lord Lyon on recording arms in 1961.

In retirement he was Vice-Lord Lieutenant of the Highland Region from 1980 until 1988.

Family
In 1939, he married Marjorie Duncan; they had two daughters.

References

1913 births
2010 deaths
British Army generals
Seaforth Highlanders officers
Companions of the Order of the Bath
Members of the Order of the British Empire
People educated at Winchester College
Alumni of Trinity College, Oxford
British Army personnel of World War II
Military personnel from London